In the 1883 Iowa State Senate elections Iowa voters elected state senators to serve in the twentieth Iowa General Assembly. Elections were held in 29 of the state senate's 50 districts. State senators serve four-year terms in the Iowa State Senate.

The general election took place on October 9, 1883.

Following the previous election, Republicans had control of the Iowa Senate with 45 seats to Democrats' two seats, two Greenbackers, and one Independent.

To claim control of the chamber from Republicans, the Democrats needed to net 24 Senate seats.

Republicans maintained control of the Iowa State Senate following the 1883 general election with the balance of power shifting to Republicans holding 39 seats and Democrats having 11 seats (a net gain of 9 seats for Democrats).

Summary of Results 
 Note: The holdover Senators not up for re-election are not listed on this table.

Source:

Detailed Results 
 NOTE: The Iowa Official Register does not contain detailed vote totals for state senate elections in 1883.

See also 
 Elections in Iowa

References

External links
Iowa Senate Districts 1884-1885

Iowa Senate
Iowa
Iowa Senate elections